The Amritsar Municipal Corporation is a nagar nigam (municipal corporation) which administers the city of Amritsar, Punjab. It has 85 members elected with a first-past-the-post voting system and 5 ex-officio members which are MLA for [Assembly Constituency members]. The corporation was founded 1977, and the first elections were held in 1991.

Mayor
The Mayor of Amritsar is the elected chief of the Municipal Corporation of Amritsar. The mayor is the first citizen of the city. The role is largely ceremonial as the real powers are vested in the Municipal Commissioner. The mayor plays a decorative role of representing and upholding the dignity of the city and a functional role in deliberating over the discussions in the corporation.

Deputy Mayors
Senior Deputy Mayor

Junior Deputy Mayor

Elections 
2017

References 

Municipal corporations in Punjab, India
Organisations based in Amritsar